Yawelmani Yokuts (also spelled Yowlumne and Yauelmani) is an endangered dialect of Southern Valley Yokuts historically spoken by the Yokuts living along the Kern River north of Kern Lake in the Central Valley of California. Today, most Yawelmani speakers live on or near the Tule River Reservation.

Name 
Academic sources frequently use the name Yawelmani while referring to the language, though tribe members more often use the name Yowlumne.

Phonology

Consonants

Vowels
Yawelmani has 8 vowel phonemes:

 There are 4 short-long vowel pairs.
 Short high vowels may become more centralized in fast speech: , .
 Long high vowels are almost always lower than their short counterparts: , .
 All long vowels may be shortened by a phonological process. Thus, a single long vowel has two different phonetic realizations:
 ,
 ,
 ,
 .

As can be seen, Yawelmani vowels have a number of different realizations (phones) which are summarized below:

Syllable & phonotactics

The Yawelmani syllables can be either a consonant-vowel sequence (CV), such as deeyi- 'lead', or a consonant-vowel-consonant sequence (CVC), such as xata- 'eat'. Thus the generalized syllable is the following:

 CV(C)

Word roots are bisyllabic and have either one of two shapes:

 CV.CV
 CV.CVC

Phonological processes

Vowel shortening
When long vowels are in closed syllables, they are shortened:

{|
| 
| →
| 
| p̓axaat̕it
| 'mourn (passive aorist)'
| ( remains long)
|-
| 
| →
| 
| p̓axat̕hin
| 'mourn (aorist)'
| ( is shortened)
|-
| 
| →
| 
| c̓uyoohun
| 'urinate (aorist)'
| ( remains long)
|-
| 
| →
| 
| c̓uyot
| 'urinate (passive aorist)'
| ( is shortened)
|}

Vowel harmony
Yawelmani has suffixes that contain either an underspecified high vowel  or an underspecified non-high vowel .
 Underspecified  will appear as  following the high rounded vowel  and as  following all other vowels :

{|
| 
| 
| 
| -hun/-hin
| (aorist suffix)
|-
| 
| →
| 
| muṭhun
| 'swear (aorist)'
|-
| 
| →
| 
| giy̓hin
| 'touch (aorist)'
|-
| 
| →
| 
| gophin
| 'take care of infant (aorist)'
|-
| 
| →
| 
| xathin
| 'eat (aorist)'
|}

 Underspecified  will appear as  following the non-high rounded vowel  and as  following all other vowels :

{|
| 
| 
| 
| -tow/-taw
| (nondirective gerundial suffix)
|-
| 
| →
| 
| goptow
| 'take care of infant (nondir. ger.)'
|-
| 
| →
| 
| giy̓taw
| 'touch (nondir. ger.)'
|-
| 
| →
| 
| muṭtaw
| 'swear (nondir. ger.)'
|-
| 
| →
| 
| xattaw
| 'eat (nondir. ger.)'
|}

Vowel epenthesis
Yawelmani adds vowels to stems, when suffixes with an initial consonant are affixed to word with two final consonants in order to avoid a triple-consonant-cluster.

Grammar

Case system 
Yawelmani is a primary object language. 

A. L. Krober documented the language's case system in his 1907 paper The Yokuts language of south central California.

Speakers 
A 2011 estimate by Victor Golla placed the number of fluent and semi-fluent Yawelmani speakers at "up to twenty-five"

Revitalization efforts 
In 1993, the Master-Apprentice Language Learning Program piloted a series of language programs that included Yawelmani. The program was reportedly effective in teaching conversational Yawelmani to tribal members without prior knowledge and increasing language use among elders.

Selected vocabulary

References

External links 

 English/Yowlumne dictionary
Yowlum'nen Trexul: Yowlumne phrase and lesson book

Endangered Yokutsan languages